The Rural Municipality of Enfield No. 194 is a rural municipality (RM) in the Canadian province of Saskatchewan within Census Division No. 7 and  Division No. 2.

History 
The RM of Enfield No. 194 incorporated as a rural municipality on December 13, 1909.

Demographics 

Government 
The RM of Enfield No. 194 is governed by an elected municipal council and an appointed administrator that meets on the second Tuesday of every month. The council comprises six councillors while the RM's administrator is Joe Van Leuken. The RM's office is located in Central Butte.

References 

E